Hospodárske noviny (abbreviated HN; meaning Economic Newspaper in English) is a daily economic newspaper published in Slovakia. It is owned by MAFRA Slovakia, a media company based in Bratislava, Slovakia.

History and profile
Hospodárske noviny was established in 1993 and is based in Bratislava. The paper is issued by Eco Press, a subsidiary of German-American firm Economia and a member of the Handelsblatt group. It is a business newspaper which has a liberal economical stance.

Hospodárske noviny is published in broadsheet format. In 2006 the newspaper went through a massive relaunch change, which resulted in an increase in sales. The current editor-in-chief is Peter Vavro.

In fall 2007, HN launched a lifestyle supplement Prečo nie?! (English: Why not?!). As of 2013 the supplement was wildly unsuccessful, selling less than a hundred copies since its initial release.

Hospodárske noviny had a circulation of 18,000 copies both in 2006 and in 2008. The 2010 circulation of the paper was 17,300 copies. In 2011 the circulation was 17,000 copies. Its readership was at 3 percent in 2013.

References

External links
Official site

1993 establishments in Slovakia
Publications established in 1993
Newspapers published in Slovakia
Slovak-language newspapers
Business newspapers
Mass media in Bratislava